Gocha Gogrichiani may refer to:
 Gocha Gogrichiani (footballer, born 1964)
 Gocha Gogrichiani (footballer, born 2000)